Fürsteneck Castle is a castle, situated in central Germany between Fulda and Bad Hersfeld. It belongs to the commune of Eiterfeld. The castle is at an elevation of 406 metres on a small plateau.

History
Fürsteneck Castle belonged to the monastery of Fulda. The first written mention of it dates to 1309, but it might have been built one or two hundred years before. After secularization in 1802, it became the property of the German state of Hesse.

Akademie Burg Fürsteneck
Since 1952 the castle has been used as an academy for vocational and cultural continuing education. It was rebuilt by the architect Otto Bartning. Each year about 4,000 participants take part in one of nearly 200 courses, with 15,000 overnight stays.

Sources
August Straub. Burgen und Schlösser im Hessenland. Melsungen: Bernecker, 1976.  
August Weber. Die Geschichte des Kreises Hünfeld. Fulda: Parzeller, 1960.  
Rudolf Christl et al. 1150 Jahre Dorf und Markt Eiterfeld. Amt und Gericht Fürsteneck. 845–1995. Eiterfeld, 1995.

External links 
 Homepage of Burg Fürsteneck 
 European Nyckelharpa training in Burg Fürsteneck 
 International Days of the Nyckelharpa at Burg Fürsteneck 
 Vocational course in medieval music at Burg Fürsteneck 

 

Castles in Hesse
Continuing education
Buildings and structures in Fulda (district)
Education in Germany
Hill castles
Jugendburg